An industrial city or industrial town is a town or city in which the municipal economy, at least historically, is centered around industry, with important factories or other production facilities in the town. It has been part of most countries'  industrialization process. Air pollution and toxic waste have contributed to the lower life expectancy in some industrial cities. Industrial cities are distinguished from port cities or other transportation hubs, which deal in services. In countries with strong central planning, such as China, a city could be created on paper, and then industry found to locate there.

In the United States, which had much sparsely populated land, the industry typically preceded the town; the town grew up around a factory, mine, or source of water power. As the industry grew, and it and its employees needed goods and services, the town grew with and often around it, until in some cases the town became a city. It is a capitalistic and typically unplanned expansion. Examples are Scranton, Pennsylvania, and the mill towns of New England. Many American industrial cities are located in the Great Lakes region of the country, often referred to as the Rust Belt, referring to the declining industry and overall economy of many cities in the region. "The industrial city" as a nickname, though, most frequently refers to South San Francisco, where the term is inscribed on a hillside sign. 

In Europe, where industries more frequently arose within existing cities, industrialization affected the internal structure of many of them. By the end of the nineteenth century the shape and functions of most cities, along with social relations, appeared fundamentally changed. Manchester, England, is considered to be the archetype of the industrial city on the basis of Friedrich Engels' observations.

In the Chinese-speaking world, the term "industrial city" refers to cities in which the municipal economy is led by heavy industries or the heavy industry is a significant impression of the city to people other than its local residents.

References

industrial cities
Types of cities
Types of towns
Secondary sector of the economy